The Mylius My 102 Tornado is a prototype single-seat German aerobatic aircraft. It was designed as a smaller derivative of the MBB Bo 209, but was not placed in production, with only two aircraft built.

Design and development
The German light aircraft manufacturer Bölkow's technical director Dr Hermann Mylius, together with two other engineers from the company, designed the two-seat MHK-101 in their spare time, with the design being adopted by Bölkow as the Bo 209, entering production in 1970.  As a follow-on to the Bo-209, Mylius began design work in July 1971 on a smaller, single-seat derivative of the Bo-209, intended as an aerobatic aircraft, the Mylius My 102 Tornado. The My 102 was considered for production by Messerschmitt-Bölkow-Blohm (MBB), the former Bölkow, as the Bo 210 Tornado, but instead, MBB abandoned production of light aircraft in order to concentrate of the Bo 105 helicopter.

The My 102 is a low-wing cantilever monoplane of all-metal construction, powered by a  Lycoming AIO-360-B1B flat-four piston engine driving a three-bladed propeller. It has a tricycle undercarriage with fixed mainwheels and a nosewheel which was retractable in the prototype with a plan to offer a fixed nosewheel as an option. The pilot sits in an enclosed cockpit, with a rearward sliding canopy. The aircraft's wings can be folded for minimise hangar space needed to store the aircraft or for towing on roads.

Work began on construction of a prototype in December 1971, and it first flew, with the registration D-EMYS, on 7 July 1973 at Neubiberg. It was successful in aerobatic competitions, taking part in the 1973 German Aerobatic Championships and the 1974 Biancotto Trophy. By 1980, a second prototype was under construction, with changes including a more powerful engine, revised wings with reduced span and wing area. Two derivatives of the My 102 were noted as being under development in the 1980 Jane's All the World's Aircraft, the two-seat My 103 Mistral (eventually to fly in 1998) and the four-seat My 104 Passat.

The second prototype, registration D-EMYM, flew for the first time on 3 April 1984. The Tornado (now styled MY-102) was being proposed for production by Mylius Flugzeugwerk of Bitburg in 1999, and was claimed to conform to European Joint Aviation Authorities airworthiness standards. Mylius was concentrating on the MY-103 by 2003, however.

Specifications (First prototype)

References

 
 
 
 
 
 
 
 

1970s German sport aircraft
Single-engined tractor aircraft
Low-wing aircraft
Aircraft first flown in 1973